Frances King may refer to:

Frances King (philanthropist) (1757–1821)
Frances King (cricketer) (1980–2003)